Serafina Corrêa is a municipality in the state of Rio Grande do Sul, Brazil.

Founded by Italian settlers at the end of the 19th century, in 2009 the city of Serafina Corrêa elected Talian, a Venetian based dialect, as co-official language alongside Portuguese.  As of 2020, the estimated population was 17,795,

See also
List of municipalities in Rio Grande do Sul
Talian dialect

References

Municipalities in Rio Grande do Sul